Charyshsky District is an administrative and municipal district (raion), one of the fifty-nine in Altai Krai, Russia. It is located in the south of the krai. Its administrative center is the rural locality (a selo) of Charyshskoye. Population:  The population of Charyshskoye accounts for 26.1% of the district's total population.

Geography
Charyshsky District is located in the southeast of Altai Krai, on the western foothills and beginnings of the Altai Mountains to the east. The Charysh River flows from east to west across the central part of the district. The area in the northwest of the district is low foothills, and the administrative center, the town of Charyshsky, is in the northwest on the Charysh River banks. Most of the southeast is forested and mountainous, on black (chernozem) southern mountain soils. Charyshsky District is 175 km west of the city of Barnaul, and 3,000 km east of Moscow. The area measures 130 km (north-south), and 80 km (west-east); total area is 6,910 km2 (about 7% of Altai Krai).

The district is bordered on the north by Ust-Kalmansky District, on the east by the Altai Republic, on the south by Kazakhstan, and on the west by Krasnoshchyokovsky District.

History
Charyshsky District was formed as part of the Biysk Altai district on May 27, 1924.  It was renamed Charyshsky District on January 1, 1932.  In 1963 it was included into Ust-Kalmansky District, but restored as a separate district (renamed Charyshsky District) later in 1963.

References

Notes

Sources

Districts of Altai Krai